Pibor, also called Pibor Post, is a town in South Sudan.

Location
Pibor located in Pibor County, in Pibor Administrative Area, in eastern South Sudan, near the border with Ethiopia. After creation of new states, it became part of Boma State.

Overview
Pibor Post is a colonial era outpost built in 1912 by the British and was originally called Fort Bruce. The town serves as the headquarters of Pibor County, one of the constituent counties of the Jonglei State before creation of new states in 2015. The Pibor River, formed by the confluence of several smaller streams, begins its journey at Pibor. The river then flows north, receiving the Akobo River near Akobo. Eventually, after receiving the Gilo River and the Bela River, it joins the Baro River to form the Sobat River.

Transport
A packed-mud road leads north to Akobo at the border with Ethiopia. Another packed-mud road leads southwest out of Pibor to the town of Bor. These roads become unusable due to flooding during the later months of the annual rainy season. Locals may move by foot, or by river when the roads are not usable. The town is also served by Pibor Airport.

Population
, it is estimated that the permanent population of Pibor Post is 1,000 people or fewer, although the data is unclear as the population is largely pastoral and few records are kept.

Points of interest

External links
The Guardian - report from famine in Pibor

See also
 Pibor Airport
 Jonglei
 Greater Upper Nile

References

Pibor Administrative Area